Batman is a superhero appearing in American comic books published by DC Comics. The character was created by artist Bob Kane and writer Bill Finger, and debuted in the 27th issue of the comic book Detective Comics on March 30, 1939. In the DC Universe continuity, Batman is the alias of Bruce Wayne, a wealthy American playboy, philanthropist, and industrialist who resides in Gotham City. Batman's origin story features him swearing vengeance against criminals after witnessing the murder of his parents Thomas and Martha as a child, a vendetta tempered with the ideal of justice. He trains himself physically and intellectually, crafts a bat-inspired persona, and monitors the Gotham streets at night. Kane, Finger, and other creators accompanied Batman with supporting characters, including his sidekicks Robin and Batgirl; allies Alfred Pennyworth, James Gordon, and Catwoman; and foes such as the Penguin, the Riddler, Two-Face, and his archenemy, the Joker.

Kane conceived Batman in early 1939 to capitalize on the popularity of DC's Superman; although Kane frequently claimed sole creation credit, Finger substantially developed the concept from a generic superhero into something more bat-like. The character received his own spin-off publication, Batman, in 1940. Batman was originally introduced as a ruthless vigilante who frequently killed or maimed criminals, but evolved into a character with a stringent moral code and strong sense of justice. Unlike most superheroes, Batman does not possess any superpowers, instead relying on his intellect, fighting skills, and wealth. The 1960s Batman television series used a camp aesthetic, which continued to be associated with the character for years after the show ended. Various creators worked to return the character to his darker roots in the 1970s and 1980s, culminating with the 1986 miniseries The Dark Knight Returns by Frank Miller.

DC has featured Batman in many comic books, including comics published under its imprints such as Vertigo and Black Label. The longest-running Batman comic, Detective Comics, is the longest-running comic book in the United States. Batman is frequently depicted alongside other DC superheroes, such as Superman and Wonder Woman, as a member of organizations such as the Justice League and the Outsiders. In addition to Bruce Wayne, other characters have taken on the Batman persona on different occasions, such as Jean-Paul Valley / Azrael in the 1993–1994 "Knightfall" story arc; Dick Grayson, the first Robin, from 2009 to 2011; and Jace Fox, son of Wayne's ally Lucius, as of 2021. DC has also published comics featuring alternate versions of Batman, including the incarnation seen in The Dark Knight Returns and its successors, the incarnation from the Flashpoint (2011) event, and numerous interpretations from Elseworlds stories.

One of the most iconic characters in popular culture, Batman has been listed among the greatest comic book superheroes and fictional characters ever created. He is one of the most commercially successful superheroes, and his likeness has been licensed and featured in various media and merchandise sold around the world; this includes toy lines such as Lego Batman and video games like the Batman: Arkham series. Batman has been adapted in live-action and animated incarnations, including the 1960s Batman television series played by Adam West and in film by Michael Keaton in Batman (1989), Batman Returns (1992), and The Flash (2023), Val Kilmer in Batman Forever (1995), George Clooney in Batman and Robin (1997),  Christian Bale in The Dark Knight trilogy (2005–2012), Ben Affleck in the DC Extended Universe (2016–present), and Robert Pattinson in The Batman (2022). Kevin Conroy, Diedrich Bader, Jensen Ackles, Troy Baker, and Will Arnett, among others, have provided the character's voice.

Publication history

Creation 

In early 1939, the success of Superman in Action Comics prompted editors at National Comics Publications (the future DC Comics) to request more superheroes for its titles. In response, Bob Kane created "the Bat-Man". Collaborator Bill Finger recalled that "Kane had an idea for a character called 'Batman,' and he'd like me to see the drawings. I went over to Kane's, and he had drawn a character who looked very much like Superman with kind of ...reddish tights, I believe, with boots ...no gloves, no gauntlets ...with a small domino mask, swinging on a rope. He had two stiff wings that were sticking out, looking like bat wings. And under it was a big sign ...BATMAN". The bat-wing-like cape was suggested by Bob Kane, inspired as a child by Leonardo da Vinci's sketch of an ornithopter flying device.

Finger suggested giving the character a cowl instead of a simple domino mask, a cape instead of wings, and gloves; he also recommended removing the red sections from the original costume. Finger said he devised the name Bruce Wayne for the character's secret identity: "Bruce Wayne's first name came from Robert the Bruce, the Scottish patriot. Wayne, being a playboy, was a man of gentry. I searched for a name that would suggest colonialism. I tried Adams, Hancock ...then I thought of Mad Anthony Wayne." He later said his suggestions were influenced by Lee Falk's popular The Phantom, a syndicated newspaper comic-strip character with which Kane was also familiar.

Kane and Finger drew upon contemporary 1930s popular culture for inspiration regarding much of the Bat-Man's look, personality, methods, and weaponry. Details find predecessors in pulp fiction, comic strips, newspaper headlines, and autobiographical details referring to Kane himself. As an aristocratic hero with a double identity, Batman had predecessors in the Scarlet Pimpernel (created by Baroness Emmuska Orczy, 1903) and Zorro (created by Johnston McCulley, 1919). Like them, Batman performed his heroic deeds in secret, averted suspicion by playing aloof in public, and marked his work with a signature symbol. Kane noted the influence of the films The Mark of Zorro (1920) and The Bat Whispers (1930) in the creation of the character's iconography. Finger, drawing inspiration from pulp heroes like Doc Savage, The Shadow, Dick Tracy, and Sherlock Holmes, made the character a master sleuth.

In his 1989 autobiography, Kane detailed Finger's contributions to Batman's creation:

Golden Age

Subsequent creation credit 
Kane signed away ownership in the character in exchange for, among other compensation, a mandatory byline on all Batman comics. This byline did not originally say "Batman created by Bob Kane"; his name was simply written on the title page of each story. The name disappeared from the comic book in the mid-1960s, replaced by credits for each story's actual writer and artists. In the late 1970s, when Jerry Siegel and Joe Shuster began receiving a "created by" credit on the Superman titles, along with William Moulton Marston being given the byline for creating Wonder Woman, Batman stories began saying "Created by Bob Kane" in addition to the other credits.

Finger did not receive the same recognition. While he had received credit for other DC work since the 1940s, he began, in the 1960s, to receive limited acknowledgment for his Batman writing; in the letters page of Batman #169 (February 1965) for example, editor Julius Schwartz names him as the creator of the Riddler, one of Batman's recurring villains. However, Finger's contract left him only with his writing page rate and no byline. Kane wrote, "Bill was disheartened by the lack of major accomplishments in his career. He felt that he had not used his creative potential to its fullest and that success had passed him by." At the time of Finger's death in 1974, DC had not officially credited Finger as Batman co-creator.

Jerry Robinson, who also worked with Finger and Kane on the strip at this time, has criticized Kane for failing to share the credit. He recalled Finger resenting his position, stating in a 2005 interview with The Comics Journal:

Although Kane initially rebutted Finger's claims at having created the character, writing in a 1965 open letter to fans that "it seemed to me that Bill Finger has given out the impression that he and not myself created the ''Batman, t'  as well as Robin and all the other leading villains and characters. This statement is fraudulent and entirely untrue." Kane himself also commented on Finger's lack of credit. "The trouble with being a 'ghost' writer or artist is that you must remain rather anonymously without 'credit'. However, if one wants the 'credit', then one has to cease being a 'ghost' or follower and become a leader or innovator."

In 1989, Kane revisited Finger's situation, recalling in an interview: 

In September 2015, DC Entertainment revealed that Finger would be receiving credit for his role in Batman's creation on the 2016 superhero film Batman v Superman: Dawn of Justice and the second season of Gotham after a deal was worked out between the Finger family and DC. Finger received credit as a creator of Batman for the first time in a comic in October 2015 with Batman and Robin Eternal #3 and Batman: Arkham Knight Genesis #3. The updated acknowledgment for the character appeared as "Batman created by Bob Kane with Bill Finger".

Early years 

The first Batman story, "The Case of the Chemical Syndicate", was published in Detective Comics #27 (cover dated May 1939). It was inspired, some say plagiarized, by the 60 page story “Partners of Peril” in The Shadow #113, which was written by Theodore Tinsley and illustrated by Tom Lovell. Finger said, "Batman was originally written in the style of the pulps", and this influence was evident with Batman showing little remorse over killing or maiming criminals. Batman proved a hit character, and he received his own solo title in 1940 while continuing to star in Detective Comics. By that time, Detective Comics was the top-selling and most influential publisher in the industry; Batman and the company's other major hero, Superman, were the cornerstones of the company's success. The two characters were featured side by side as the stars of World's Finest Comics, which was originally titled World's Best Comics when it debuted in fall 1940. Creators including Jerry Robinson and Dick Sprang also worked on the strips during this period.

Over the course of the first few Batman strips elements were added to the character and the artistic depiction of Batman evolved. Kane noted that within six issues he drew the character's jawline more pronounced, and lengthened the ears on the costume. "About a year later he was almost the full figure, my mature Batman", Kane said. Batman's characteristic utility belt was introduced in Detective Comics #29 (July 1939), followed by the boomerang-like batarang and the first bat-themed vehicle, the Batplane, in #31 (September 1939). The character's origin was revealed in #33 (November 1939), unfolding in a two-page story that establishes the brooding persona of Batman, a character driven by the death of his parents. Written by Finger, it depicts a young Bruce Wayne witnessing his parents' murder at the hands of a mugger. Days later, at their grave, the child vows that "by the spirits of my parents [I will] avenge their deaths by spending the rest of my life warring on all criminals".

The early, pulp-inflected portrayal of Batman started to soften in Detective Comics #38 (April 1940) with the introduction of Robin, Batman's junior counterpart. Robin was introduced, based on Finger's suggestion, because Batman needed a "Watson" with whom Batman could talk. Sales nearly doubled, despite Kane's preference for a solo Batman, and it sparked a proliferation of "kid sidekicks". The first issue of the solo spin-off series Batman was notable not only for introducing two of his most persistent enemies, the Joker and Catwoman, but for a pre-Robin inventory story, originally meant for Detective Comics #38, in which Batman shoots some monstrous giants to death. That story prompted editor Whitney Ellsworth to decree that the character could no longer kill or use a gun.

By 1942, the writers and artists behind the Batman comics had established most of the basic elements of the Batman mythos. In the years following World War II, DC Comics "adopted a postwar editorial direction that increasingly de-emphasized social commentary in favor of lighthearted juvenile fantasy". The impact of this editorial approach was evident in Batman comics of the postwar period; removed from the "bleak and menacing world" of the strips of the early 1940s, Batman was instead portrayed as a respectable citizen and paternal figure that inhabited a "bright and colorful" environment.

Silver and Bronze Ages

1950s and early 1960s 
Batman was one of the few superhero characters to be continuously published as interest in the genre waned during the 1950s. In the story "The Mightiest Team in the World" in Superman #76 (June 1952), Batman teams up with Superman for the first time and the pair discover each other's secret identity. Following the success of this story, World's Finest Comics was revamped so it featured stories starring both heroes together, instead of the separate Batman and Superman features that had been running before. The team-up of the characters was "a financial success in an era when those were few and far between"; this series of stories ran until the book's cancellation in 1986.

Batman comics were among those criticized when the comic book industry came under scrutiny with the publication of psychologist Fredric Wertham's book Seduction of the Innocent in 1954. Wertham's thesis was that children imitated crimes committed in comic books, and that these works corrupted the morals of the youth. Wertham criticized Batman comics for their supposed homosexual overtones and argued that Batman and Robin were portrayed as lovers. Wertham's criticisms raised a public outcry during the 1950s, eventually leading to the establishment of the Comics Code Authority, a code that is no longer in use by the comic book industry. The tendency towards a "sunnier Batman" in the postwar years intensified after the introduction of the Comics Code. Scholars have suggested that the characters of Batwoman (in 1956) and the pre-Barbara Gordon Bat-Girl (in 1961) were introduced in part to refute the allegation that Batman and Robin were gay, and the stories took on a campier, lighter feel.

In the late 1950s, Batman stories gradually became more science fiction-oriented, an attempt at mimicking the success of other DC characters that had dabbled in the genre. New characters such as Batwoman, the original Bat-Girl, Ace the Bat-Hound, and Bat-Mite were introduced. Batman's adventures often involved odd transformations or bizarre space aliens. In 1960, Batman debuted as a member of the Justice League of America in The Brave and the Bold #28 (February 1960), and went on to appear in several Justice League comic book series starting later that same year.

"New Look" Batman and camp 
By 1964, sales of Batman titles had fallen drastically. Bob Kane noted that, as a result, DC was "planning to kill Batman off altogether". In response to this, editor Julius Schwartz was assigned to the Batman titles. He presided over drastic changes, beginning with 1964's Detective Comics #327 (May 1964), which was cover-billed as the "New Look". Schwartz introduced changes designed to make Batman more contemporary, and to return him to more detective-oriented stories. He brought in artist Carmine Infantino to help overhaul the character. The Batmobile was redesigned, and Batman's costume was modified to incorporate a yellow ellipse behind the bat-insignia. The space aliens, time travel, and characters of the 1950s such as Batwoman, Ace the Bat-Hound, and Bat-Mite were retired. Bruce Wayne's butler Alfred was killed off (though his death was quickly reversed) while a new female relative for the Wayne family, Aunt Harriet Cooper, came to live with Bruce Wayne and Dick Grayson.

The debut of the Batman television series in 1966 had a profound influence on the character. The success of the series increased sales throughout the comic book industry, and Batman reached a circulation of close to 900,000 copies. Elements such as the character of Batgirl and the show's campy nature were introduced into the comics; the series also initiated the return of Alfred. Although both the comics and TV show were successful for a time, the camp approach eventually wore thin and the show was canceled in 1968. In the aftermath, the Batman comics themselves lost popularity once again. As Julius Schwartz noted, "When the television show was a success, I was asked to be campy, and of course when the show faded, so did the comic books."

Starting in 1969, writer Dennis O'Neil and artist Neal Adams made a deliberate effort to distance Batman from the campy portrayal of the 1960s TV series and to return the character to his roots as a "grim avenger of the night". O'Neil said his idea was "simply to take it back to where it started. I went to the DC library and read some of the early stories. I tried to get a sense of what Kane and Finger were after."

O'Neil and Adams first collaborated on the story "The Secret of the Waiting Graves" in Detective Comics #395 (January 1970). Few stories were true collaborations between O'Neil, Adams, Schwartz, and inker Dick Giordano, and in actuality these men were mixed and matched with various other creators during the 1970s; nevertheless the influence of their work was "tremendous". Giordano said: "We went back to a grimmer, darker Batman, and I think that's why these stories did so well ..." While the work of O'Neil and Adams was popular with fans, the acclaim did little to improve declining sales; the same held true with a similarly acclaimed run by writer Steve Englehart and penciler Marshall Rogers in Detective Comics #471–476 (August 1977 – April 1978), which went on to influence the 1989 movie Batman and be adapted for Batman: The Animated Series, which debuted in 1992. Regardless, circulation continued to drop through the 1970s and 1980s, hitting an all-time low in 1985.

Modern Age

The Dark Knight Returns 
Frank Miller's limited series The Dark Knight Returns (February – June 1986) returned the character to his darker roots, both in atmosphere and tone. The comic book, which tells the story of a 55-year-old Batman coming out of retirement in a possible future, reinvigorated interest in the character. The Dark Knight Returns was a financial success and has since become one of the medium's most noted touchstones. The series also sparked a major resurgence in the character's popularity.

That year Dennis O'Neil took over as editor of the Batman titles and set the template for the portrayal of Batman following DC's status quo-altering 12-issue miniseries Crisis on Infinite Earths. O'Neil operated under the assumption that he was hired to revamp the character and as a result tried to instill a different tone in the books than had gone before. One outcome of this new approach was the "Year One" storyline in Batman #404–407 (February – May 1987), in which Frank Miller and artist David Mazzucchelli redefined the character's origins. Writer Alan Moore and artist Brian Bolland continued this dark trend with 1988's 48-page one-shot issue Batman: The Killing Joke, in which the Joker, attempting to drive Commissioner Gordon insane, cripples Gordon's daughter Barbara, and then kidnaps and tortures the commissioner, physically and psychologically.

The Batman comics garnered major attention in 1988 when DC Comics created a 900 number for readers to call to vote on whether Jason Todd, the second Robin, lived or died. Voters decided in favor of Jason's death by a narrow margin of 28 votes (see Batman: A Death in the Family).

Knightfall 
The 1993 "Knightfall" story arc introduced a new villain, Bane, who critically injures Batman after pushing him to the limits of his endurance. Jean-Paul Valley, known as Azrael, is called upon to wear the Batsuit during Bruce Wayne's convalescence. Writers Doug Moench, Chuck Dixon, and Alan Grant worked on the Batman titles during "Knightfall", and would also contribute to other Batman crossovers throughout the 1990s. 1998's "Cataclysm" storyline served as the precursor to 1999's "No Man's Land", a year-long storyline that ran through all the Batman-related titles dealing with the effects of an earthquake-ravaged Gotham City. At the conclusion of "No Man's Land", O'Neil stepped down as editor and was replaced by Bob Schreck.

Another writer who rose to prominence on the Batman comic series, was Jeph Loeb. Along with longtime collaborator Tim Sale, they wrote two miniseries (The Long Halloween and Dark Victory) that pit an early-in-his-career version of Batman against his entire rogues gallery (including Two-Face, whose origin was re-envisioned by Loeb) while dealing with various mysteries involving serial killers Holiday and the Hangman. In 2003, Loeb teamed with artist Jim Lee to work on another mystery arc: "Batman: Hush" for the main Batman book. The 12–issue story line has Batman and Catwoman teaming up against Batman's entire rogues gallery, including an apparently resurrected Jason Todd, while seeking to find the identity of the mysterious supervillain Hush. While the character of Hush failed to catch on with readers, the arc was a sales success for DC. The series became #1 on the Diamond Comic Distributors sales chart for the first time since Batman #500 (October 1993) and Todd's appearance laid the groundwork for writer Judd Winick's subsequent run as writer on Batman, with another multi-issue arc, "Under the Hood", which ran from Batman #637–650 (April 2005 – April 2006).

21st century

All Star Batman & Robin the Boy Wonder 

In 2005, DC launched All Star Batman & Robin the Boy Wonder, a stand-alone comic book miniseries set outside the main DC Universe continuity. Written by Frank Miller and drawn by Jim Lee, the series was a commercial success for DC Comics, although it was widely panned by critics for its writing and strong depictions of violence.

Starting in 2006, Grant Morrison and Paul Dini were the regular writers of Batman and Detective Comics, with Morrison reincorporating controversial elements of Batman lore. Most notably of these elements were the science fiction-themed storylines of the 1950s Batman comics, which Morrison revised as hallucinations Batman experienced under the influence of various mind-bending gases and extensive sensory deprivation training. Morrison's run climaxed with "Batman R.I.P.", which brought Batman up against the villainous "Black Glove" organization, which sought to drive Batman into madness. "Batman R.I.P." segued into Final Crisis (also written by Morrison), which saw the apparent death of Batman at the hands of Darkseid. In the 2009 miniseries Batman: Battle for the Cowl, Wayne's former protégé Dick Grayson becomes the new Batman, and Wayne's son Damian becomes the new Robin. In June 2009, Judd Winick returned to writing Batman, while Grant Morrison was given their own series, titled Batman and Robin.

In 2010, the storyline Batman: The Return of Bruce Wayne saw Bruce travel through history, eventually returning to the present day. Although he reclaimed the mantle of Batman, he also allowed Grayson to continue being Batman as well. Bruce decided to take his crime-fighting cause globally, which is the central focus of Batman Incorporated. DC Comics would later announce that Grayson would be the main character in Batman, Detective Comics, and Batman and Robin, while Wayne would be the main character in Batman Incorporated. Also, Bruce appeared in another ongoing series, Batman: The Dark Knight.

The New 52 

In September 2011, DC Comics' entire line of superhero comic books, including its Batman franchise, were cancelled and relaunched with new #1 issues as part of The New 52 reboot. Bruce Wayne is the only character to be identified as Batman and is featured in Batman, Detective Comics, Batman and Robin, and Batman: The Dark Knight. Dick Grayson returns to the mantle of Nightwing and appears in his own ongoing series. While many characters have their histories significantly altered to attract new readers, Batman's history remains mostly intact. Batman Incorporated was relaunched in 2012–2013 to complete the "Leviathan" storyline.

With the beginning of The New 52, Scott Snyder was the writer of the Batman title. His first major story arc was "Night of the Owls", where Batman confronts the Court of Owls, a secret society that has controlled Gotham for centuries. The second story arc was "Death of the Family", where the Joker returns to Gotham and simultaneously attacks each member of the Batman family. The third story arc was "Batman: Zero Year", which redefined Batman's origin in The New 52. It followed Batman vol. 2 #0, published in June 2012, which explored the character's early years. The final storyline before the Convergence (2015) storyline was "Endgame", depicting the supposed final battle between Batman and the Joker when he unleashes the deadly Endgame virus onto Gotham City. The storyline ends with Batman and the Joker's supposed deaths.

Starting with Batman vol. 2 #41, Commissioner James Gordon takes over Bruce's mantle as a new, state-sanctioned, robotic-Batman, debuting in the Free Comic Book Day special comic Divergence. However, Bruce Wayne is soon revealed to be alive, albeit now with almost total amnesia of his life as Batman and only remembering his life as Bruce Wayne through what he has learned from Alfred. Bruce Wayne finds happiness and proposes to his girlfriend, Julie Madison, but Mr. Bloom heavily injures Jim Gordon and takes control of Gotham City and threatens to destroy the city by energizing a particle reactor to create a "strange star" to swallow the city. Bruce Wayne discovers the truth that he was Batman and after talking to a stranger who smiles a lot (it is heavily implied that this is the amnesic Joker) he forces Alfred to implant his memories as Batman, but at the cost of his memories as the reborn Bruce Wayne. He returns and helps Jim Gordon defeat Mr. Bloom and shut down the reactor. Gordon gets his job back as the commissioner, and the government Batman project is shut down.

In 2015, DC Comics released The Dark Knight III: The Master Race, the sequel to Frank Miller's The Dark Knight Returns and The Dark Knight Strikes Again.

DC Rebirth and Infinite Frontier 

In June 2016, the DC Rebirth event relaunched DC Comics' entire line of comic book titles. Batman was rebooted as starting with a one-shot issue entitled Batman: Rebirth #1 (August 2016). The series then began shipping twice-monthly as a third volume, starting with Batman vol. 3 #1 (August 2016). The third volume of Batman was written by Tom King, and artwork was provided by David Finch and Mikel Janín. The Batman series introduced two vigilantes, Gotham and Gotham Girl. Detective Comics resumed its original numbering system starting with June 2016's #934, and the New 52 series was labeled as volume 2, with issues numbering from #1-52. Similarly with the Batman title, the New 52 issues were labeled as volume 2 and encompassed issues #1-52. Writer James Tynion IV and artists Eddy Barrows and Alvaro Martinez worked on Detective Comics #934, and the series initially featured a team consisting of Tim Drake, Stephanie Brown, Cassandra Cain, and Clayface, led by Batman and Batwoman.

DC Comics ended the DC Rebirth branding in December 2017, opting to include everything under a larger DC Universe banner and naming. The continuity established by DC Rebirth continues across DC's comic book titles, including volume 1 of Detective Comics and volume 3 of Batman.

After the conclusion of Batman vol. 3 #85 a new creative team consisting of James Tynion IV with art by Tony S. Daniel and Danny Miki replaced Tom King, David Finch and Mikel Janín. Following Tynion's departure from DC Comics, Joshua Williamson, who previously wrote the backup story in issue #106, briefly became the new head writer in December 2021 starting with issue #118. Chip Zdarsky then became the head writer with artist Jorge Jimenez returning after having previously illustrated parts of Tynion's run. Their run begun with issue #125, which was released on July 5, 2022 and starts with "Failsafe", a six-issue story arc.

Characterization

Bruce Wayne 

Batman's secret identity is Bruce Wayne, a wealthy American industrialist. As a child, Bruce witnessed the murder of his parents, Dr. Thomas Wayne and Martha Wayne, which ultimately led him to craft the Batman persona and seek justice against criminals. He resides on the outskirts of Gotham City in his personal residence, Wayne Manor. Wayne averts suspicion by acting the part of a superficial playboy idly living off his family's fortune and the profits of Wayne Enterprises, his inherited conglomerate. He supports philanthropic causes through his nonprofit Wayne Foundation, which in part addresses social issues encouraging crime as well as assisting victims of it, but is more widely known as a celebrity socialite. In public, he frequently appears in the company of high-status women, which encourages tabloid gossip while feigning near-drunkenness with consuming large quantities of disguised ginger ale since Wayne is actually a strict teetotaler to maintain his physical and mental prowess. Although Bruce Wayne leads an active romantic life, his vigilante activities as Batman account for most of his time.

Various modern stories have portrayed the extravagant, playboy image of Bruce Wayne as a facade. This is in contrast to the Post-Crisis Superman, whose Clark Kent persona is the true identity, while the Superman persona is the facade. In Batman Unmasked, a television documentary about the psychology of the character, behavioral scientist Benjamin Karney notes that Batman's personality is driven by Bruce Wayne's inherent humanity; that "Batman, for all its benefits and for all of the time Bruce Wayne devotes to it, is ultimately a tool for Bruce Wayne's efforts to make the world better". Bruce Wayne's principles include the desire to prevent future harm and a vow not to kill. Bruce Wayne believes that our actions define us, we fail for a reason and anything is possible.

Writers of Batman and Superman stories have often compared and contrasted the two. Interpretations vary depending on the writer, the story, and the timing. Grant Morrison notes that both heroes "believe in the same kind of things" despite the day/night contrast their heroic roles display. Morrison notes an equally stark contrast in their real identities. Bruce Wayne and Clark Kent belong to different social classes: "Bruce has a butler, Clark has a boss." T. James Musler's book Unleashing the Superhero in Us All explores the extent to which Bruce Wayne's vast personal wealth is important in his life story, and the crucial role it plays in his efforts as Batman.

Will Brooker notes in his book Batman Unmasked that "the confirmation of the Batman's identity lies with the young audience ...he doesn't have to be Bruce Wayne; he just needs the suit and gadgets, the abilities, and most importantly the morality, the humanity. There's just a sense about him: 'they trust him ...and they're never wrong."

Personality 
Batman's primary character traits can be summarized as "wealth; physical prowess; deductive abilities and obsession". The details and tone of Batman comic books have varied over the years with different creative teams. Dennis O'Neil noted that character consistency was not a major concern during early editorial regimes: "Julie Schwartz did a Batman in Batman and Detective and Murray Boltinoff did a Batman in the Brave and the Bold and apart from the costume they bore very little resemblance to each other. Julie and Murray did not want to coordinate their efforts, nor were they asked to do so. Continuity was not important in those days."

The driving force behind Bruce Wayne's character is his parents' murder and their absence. Bob Kane and Bill Finger discussed Batman's background and decided that "there's nothing more traumatic than having your parents murdered before your eyes". Despite his trauma, he sets his mind on studying to become a scientist and to train his body into physical perfection to fight crime in Gotham City as Batman, an inspired idea from Wayne's insight into the criminal mind. He also speaks over 40 different languages.

Another of Batman's characterizations is that of a vigilante; in order to stop evil that started with the death of his parents, he must sometimes break the law himself. Although manifested differently by being re-told by different artists, it is nevertheless that the details and the prime components of Batman's origin have never varied at all in the comic books, the "reiteration of the basic origin events holds together otherwise divergent expressions". The origin is the source of the character's traits and attributes, which play out in many of the character's adventures.

Batman is often treated as a vigilante by other characters in his stories. Frank Miller views the character as "a dionysian figure, a force for anarchy that imposes an individual order". Dressed as a bat, Batman deliberately cultivates a frightening persona in order to aid him in crime-fighting, a fear that originates from the criminals' own guilty conscience. Miller is often credited with reintroducing anti-heroic traits into Batman's characterization, such as his brooding personality, willingness to use violence and torture, and increasingly alienated behavior. Batman, shortly a year after his debut and the introduction of Robin, was changed in 1940 after DC editor Whitney Ellsworth felt the character would be tainted by his lethal methods and DC established their own ethical code, subsequently he was retconned to have a stringent moral code, which has stayed with the character of Batman ever since. Miller's Batman was closer to the original pre-Robin version, who was willing to kill criminals if necessary.

Others 
On several occasions former Robin Dick Grayson has served as Batman; most notably in 2009 while Wayne was believed dead, and served as a second Batman even after Wayne returned in 2010. As part of DC's 2011 continuity relaunch, Grayson returned to being Nightwing following the Flashpoint crossover event.

In an interview with IGN, Morrison detailed that having Dick Grayson as Batman and Damian Wayne as Robin represented a "reverse" of the normal dynamic between Batman and Robin, with, "a more light-hearted and spontaneous Batman and a scowling, badass Robin". Morrison explained their intentions for the new characterization of Batman: "Dick Grayson is kind of this consummate superhero. The guy has been Batman's partner since he was a kid, he's led the Teen Titans, and he's trained with everybody in the DC Universe. So he's a very different kind of Batman. He's a lot easier;  a lot looser and more relaxed."

Over the years, there have been numerous others to assume the name of Batman, or to officially take over for Bruce during his leaves of absence. Jean-Paul Valley, also known as Azrael, assumed the cowl after the events of the Knightfall saga. Jim Gordon donned a mecha-suit after the events of Batman: Endgame, and served as Batman in 2015 and 2016. In 2021, as part of the Fear State crossover event, Lucius Fox's son Jace Fox succeeds Bruce as Batman in a 2021 storyline, depicted in the series I Am Batman, after Batman was declared dead.

Additionally, members of the group Batman Incorporated, Bruce Wayne's experiment at franchising his brand of vigilantism, have at times stood in as the official Batman in cities around the world. Various others have also taken up the role of Batman in stories set in alternative universes and possible futures, including, among them, various former proteges of Bruce Wayne.

Supporting characters 

Batman's interactions with both villains and cohorts have, over time, developed a strong supporting cast of characters.

Enemies 

Batman faces a variety of foes ranging from common criminals to outlandish supervillains. Many of them mirror aspects of the Batman's character and development, often having tragic origin stories that lead them to a life of crime. These foes are commonly referred to as Batman's rogues gallery. Batman's "most implacable foe" is the Joker, a homicidal maniac with a clown-like appearance. The Joker is considered by critics to be his perfect adversary, since he is the antithesis of Batman in personality and appearance; the Joker has a maniacal demeanor with a colorful appearance, while Batman has a serious and resolute demeanor with a dark appearance. As a "personification of the irrational", the Joker represents "everything Batman [opposes]". Other long-time recurring foes that are part of Batman's rogues gallery include Catwoman (a cat burglar anti-heroine who is an occasional ally and romantic interest), the Penguin, Ra's al Ghul, Two-Face, the Riddler, the Scarecrow, Mr. Freeze, Poison Ivy, Harley Quinn, Bane, Clayface, and Killer Croc, among others. Many of Batman's adversaries are often psychiatric patients at Arkham Asylum.

Allies 

Alfred

Batman's butler, Alfred Pennyworth, first appeared in Batman #16 (1943). He serves as Bruce Wayne's loyal father figure and is one of the few persons to know his secret identity. Alfred raised Bruce after his parents' death and knows him on a very personal level. He is sometimes portrayed as a sidekick to Batman and the only other resident of Wayne Manor aside from Bruce. The character "[lends] a homely touch to Batman's environs and [is] ever ready to provide a steadying and reassuring hand" to the hero and his sidekick.

"Batman family"
The informal name "Batman family" is used for a group of characters closely allied with Batman, generally masked vigilantes who either have been trained by Batman or operate in Gotham City with his tacit approval. They include: Barbara Gordon, Commissioner Gordon's daughter, who has fought crime under the vigilante identity of Batgirl and, during a period in which she was reliant on a wheelchair due to a gunshot wound inflicted by the Joker, the computer hacker the Oracle; Helena Bertinelli, the sole surviving member of a mob family turned vigilante, who has worked with Batman on occasion, primarily as the Huntress and as Batgirl for a brief stint; Cassandra Cain, the daughter of professional assassins David Cain, and Lady Shiva, who succeeded Bertinelli as Batgirl.

Civilians
Lucius Fox, a technology specialist and Bruce Wayne's business manager who is well aware of his employer's clandestine vigilante activities; Dr. Leslie Thompkins, a family friend who like Alfred became a surrogate parental figure to Bruce Wayne after the deaths of his parents, and is also aware of his secret identity; Vicki Vale, an investigative journalist who often reports on Batman's activities for the Gotham Gazette; Ace the Bat-Hound, Batman's canine partner who was mainly active in the 1950s and 1960s; and Bat-Mite, an extra-dimensional imp mostly active in the 1960s who idolizes Batman.

GCPD

As Batman's ally in the Gotham City police, Commissioner James "Jim" Gordon debuted along with Batman in Detective Comics #27 and has been a consistent presence ever since. As a crime-fighting everyman, he shares Batman's goals while offering, much as the character of Dr. Watson does in Sherlock Holmes stories, a normal person's perspective on the work of Batman's extraordinary genius.

Justice League

Batman is at times a member of superhero teams such as the Justice League of America and the Outsiders. Batman has often been paired in adventures with his Justice League teammate Superman, notably as the co-stars of World's Finest Comics and Superman/Batman series. In Pre-Crisis continuity, the two are depicted as close friends; however, in current continuity, they are still close friends but an uneasy relationship, with an emphasis on their differing views on crime-fighting and justice. In Superman/Batman #3 (December 2003), Superman observes, "Sometimes, I admit, I think of Bruce as a man in a costume. Then, with some gadget from his utility belt, he reminds me that he has an extraordinarily inventive mind. And how lucky I am to be able to call on him."

Robin

Robin, Batman's vigilante partner, has been a widely recognized supporting character for many years. Bill Finger stated that he wanted to include Robin because "Batman didn't have anyone to talk to, and it got a little tiresome always having him thinking." The first Robin, Dick Grayson, was introduced in 1940. In the 1970s he finally grew up, went off to college and became the hero Nightwing. A second Robin, Jason Todd, appeared in the 1980s. In the stories he was eventually badly beaten and then killed in an explosion set by the Joker, but was later revived. He used the Joker's old persona, the Red Hood, and became an antihero vigilante with no qualms about using firearms or deadly force. Carrie Kelley, the first female Robin to appear in Batman stories, was the final Robin in the continuity of Frank Miller's graphic novels The Dark Knight Returns and The Dark Knight Strikes Again, fighting alongside an aging Batman in stories set out of the mainstream continuity.

The third Robin in the mainstream comics is Tim Drake, who first appeared in 1989. He went on to star in his own comic series, and currently goes by the Red Robin, a variation on the traditional Robin persona. In the first decade of the new millennium, Stephanie Brown served as the fourth in-universe Robin between stints as her self-made vigilante identity the Spoiler, and later as Batgirl. After Brown's apparent death, Drake resumed the role of Robin for a time. The role eventually passed to Damian Wayne, the 10-year-old son of Bruce Wayne and Talia al Ghul, in the late 2000s. Damian's tenure as du jour Robin ended when the character was killed off in the pages of Batman Incorporated in 2013. Batman's next young sidekick is Harper Row, a streetwise young woman who avoids the name Robin but followed the ornithological theme nonetheless; she debuted the codename and identity of the Bluebird in 2014. Unlike the Robins, the Bluebird is willing and permitted to use a gun, albeit non-lethal; her weapon of choice is a modified rifle that fires taser rounds. In 2015, a new series began titled We Are...Robin, focused on a group of teenagers using the Robin persona to fight crime in Gotham City. The most prominent of these, Duke Thomas, later becomes Batman's crimefighting partner as The Signal.

Relationships

Family tree
Helena Wayne is the biological daughter of Bruce Wayne and Selina Kyle of an alternate universe established in the early 1960s (Multiverse) where the Golden Age stories took place. Damian Wayne is the biological son of Bruce Wayne and Talia al Ghul, and thus the grandson of Ra's al Ghul. Terry McGinnis and his brother Matt are the biological sons of Bruce Wayne and Mary McGinnis in the DC animated universe, and Terry has taken over the role as Batman when Bruce has become too old to do so.

Romantic interests 
Writers have varied in the approach over the years to the "playboy" aspect of Bruce Wayne's persona. Some writers show his playboy reputation as a manufactured illusion to support his mission as Batman, while others have depicted Bruce Wayne as genuinely enjoying the benefits of being "Gotham's most eligible bachelor". Bruce Wayne has been portrayed as being romantically linked with many women throughout his various incarnations. The most significant relationships occurred with Selina Kyle, who is also Catwoman and Talia al Ghul, as both women gave birth to his biological offsprings, Helena Wayne and Damian Wayne, respectively.

Batman's first romantic interest was Julie Madison in Detective Comics #31 (September 1939); however, their romance was short-lived. Some of Batman's romantic interests have been women with a respected status in society, such as Julie Madison, Vicki Vale, and Silver St. Cloud. Batman has also been romantically involved with allies, such as Kathy Kane (Batwoman), Sasha Bordeaux, and Wonder Woman, and with villains, such as Selina Kyle (Catwoman), Jezebel Jet, Pamela Isley (Poison Ivy), and Talia al Ghul.

Catwoman

While most of Batman's romantic relationships tend to be short in duration, Catwoman has been his most enduring romance throughout the years. The attraction between Batman and Catwoman, whose real name is Selina Kyle, is present in nearly every version and medium in which the characters appear, including a love story between their two secret identities as early as in the 1966 film Batman. Although Catwoman is typically portrayed as a villain, Batman and Catwoman have worked together in achieving common goals and are usually depicted as having a romantic connection.

In an early 1980s storyline, Selina Kyle and Bruce Wayne develop a relationship, in which the closing panel of the final story shows her referring to Batman as "Bruce". However, a change in the editorial team brought a swift end to that storyline and, apparently, all that transpired during the story arc. Out of costume, Bruce and Selina develop a romantic relationship during The Long Halloween. The story shows Selina saving Bruce from Poison Ivy. However, the relationship ends when Bruce rejects her advances twice; once as Bruce and once as Batman. In Batman: Dark Victory, he stands her up on two holidays, causing her to leave him for good and to leave Gotham City for a while. When the two meet at an opera many years later, during the events of the 12-issue story arc called "Hush", Bruce comments that the two no longer have a relationship as Bruce and Selina. However, "Hush" sees Batman and Catwoman allied against the entire rogues gallery and rekindling their romantic relationship. In "Hush", Batman reveals his true identity to Catwoman.

The Earth-Two Batman, a character from a parallel world, partners with and marries the reformed Earth-Two Selina Kyle, as shown in Superman Family #211. They have a daughter named Helena Wayne, who becomes the Huntress. Along with Dick Grayson, the Earth-Two Robin, the Huntress takes the role as Gotham's protector once Bruce Wayne retires to become police commissioner, a position he occupies until he is killed during one final adventure as Batman.

Batman and Catwoman are shown having a sexual encounter on the roof of a building in Catwoman vol. 4 #1 (2011); the same issue implies that the two have an ongoing sexual relationship. Following the 2016 DC Rebirth continuity reboot, the two once again have a sexual encounter on top of a building in Batman vol. 3 #14 (2017).

Following the 2016 DC Rebirth continuity reboot, Batman and Catwoman work together in the third volume of Batman. The two also have a romantic relationship, in which they are shown having a sexual encounter on a rooftop and sleeping together. Bruce proposes to Selina in Batman vol. 3 #24 (2017), and in issue #32, Selina asks Bruce to propose to her again. When he does so, she says, "Yes."

Batman vol. 3 Annual #2 (January 2018) centers on a romantic storyline between Batman and Catwoman. Towards the end, the story is flash-forwarded to the future, in which Bruce Wayne and Selina Kyle are a married couple in their golden years. Bruce receives a terminal medical diagnosis, and Selina cares for him until his death.

Abilities

Skills and training 
Batman has no inherent superhuman powers; he relies on "his own scientific knowledge, detective skills, and athletic prowess". Batman's inexhaustible wealth gives him access to advanced technologies, and as a proficient scientist, he is able to use and modify these technologies to his advantage. In the stories, Batman is regarded as one of the world's greatest detectives, if not the world's greatest crime solver. Batman has been repeatedly described as having a genius-level intellect, being one of the greatest martial artists in the DC Universe, and having peak human physical and mental conditioning. As a polymath, his knowledge and expertise in countless disciplines is nearly unparalleled by any other character in the DC Universe. He has shown prowess in assorted fields such as mathematics, biology, physics, chemistry, and several levels of engineering.  He has traveled the world acquiring the skills needed to aid him in his endeavors as Batman. In the Superman: Doomed story arc, Superman considers Batman to be one of the most brilliant minds on the planet.

Batman has trained extensively in various different fighting styles, making him one of the best hand-to-hand fighters in the DC Universe. He has fully utilized his photographic memory to master a total of 127 different forms of martial arts including, but not limited to, Aikido, boxing, Brazilian jiu-jitsu, Capoeira, Eskrima, fencing, Gatka, Hapkido, Jeet Kune Do, Judo, Kalaripayattu, Karate, Kenjutsu, Kenpo, kickboxing, Kobudo, Krav Maga, Kyudo, Muay Thai, Ninjutsu, Pankration, Sambo, Savate, Silat, Taekwondo, wrestling, numerous different styles of Wushu (Kung Fu) (such as Baguazhang, Chin Na, Hung Ga, Shaolinquan, Tai Chi, Wing Chun), and Yaw-Yan. In terms of his physical condition, Batman is in peak, Olympic-athlete-level condition, easily-able to run-across rooftops in a Parkour-esque fashion. Superman describes Batman as "the most dangerous man on Earth", able to defeat an entire team of superpowered extra-terrestrials by himself in order to rescue his imprisoned teammates in Grant Morrison's first storyline in JLA.

Batman is strongly disciplined, and he has the ability to function under great physical pain and resist most forms of telepathy and mind control. He is a master of disguise, multilingual, and an expert in espionage, often gathering information under the identity of a notorious gangster named Matches Malone. Batman is highly skilled in stealth movement and escapology, which allows him to appear and disappear at will and to break free of nearly inescapable deathtraps with little to no harm.

Batman is an expert in interrogation techniques and his intimidating and frightening appearance alone is often all that is needed in getting information from suspects. Despite having the potential to harm his enemies, Batman's most defining characteristic is his strong commitment to justice and his reluctance to take a life. This unyielding moral rectitude has earned him the respect of several heroes in the DC Universe, most notably that of Superman and Wonder Woman.

Among physical and other crime fighting related training, he is also proficient at other types of skills. Some of these include being a licensed pilot (in order to operate the Batplane), as well as being able to operate other types of machinery. In some publications, he underwent some magician training.

Technology 
Batman utilizes a vast arsenal of specialized, high-tech vehicles and gadgets in his war against crime, the designs of which usually share a bat motif. Batman historian Les Daniels credits Gardner Fox with creating the concept of Batman's arsenal with the introduction of the utility belt in Detective Comics #29 (July 1939) and the first bat-themed weapons the batarang and the "Batgyro" in Detective Comics #31 and 32 (Sept. and October 1939).

Personal armor

Batman's batsuit aids in his combat against enemies, having the properties of both Kevlar and Nomex. It protects him from gunfire and other significant impacts, and incorporates the imagery of a bat in order to frighten criminals.

The details of the Batman costume change repeatedly through various decades, stories, media and artists' interpretations, but the most distinctive elements remain consistent: a scallop-hem cape; a cowl covering most of the face; a pair of bat-like ears; a stylized bat emblem on the chest; and the ever-present utility belt. His gloves typically feature three scallops that protrude from long, gauntlet-like cuffs, although in his earliest appearances he wore short, plain gloves without the scallops. The overall look of the character, particularly the length of the cowl's ears and of the cape, varies greatly depending on the artist. Dennis O'Neil said, "We now say that Batman has two hundred suits hanging in the Batcave so they don't have to look the same ...Everybody loves to draw Batman, and everybody wants to put their own spin on it."

Finger and Kane originally conceptualized Batman as having a black cape and cowl and grey suit, but conventions in coloring called for black to be highlighted with blue. Hence, the costume's colors have appeared in the comics as dark blue and grey; as well as black and grey. In the Tim Burton's Batman and Batman Returns films, Batman has been depicted as completely black with a bat in the middle surrounded by a yellow background. Christopher Nolan's The Dark Knight Trilogy depicted Batman wearing high-tech gear painted completely black with a black bat in the middle. Ben Affleck's Batman in the DC Extended Universe films wears a suit grey in color with a black cowl, cape, and bat symbol.

Batmobile

Batman's primary vehicle is the Batmobile, which is usually depicted as an imposing black car, often with tailfins that suggest a bat's wings.

Batman also has an aircraft called the Batplane (later called the "Batwing"), along with various other means of transportation.

In proper practice, the "bat" prefix (as in Batmobile or batarang) is rarely used by Batman himself when referring to his equipment, particularly after some portrayals (primarily the 1960s Batman live-action television show and the Super Friends animated series) stretched the practice to campy proportions. For example, the 1960s television show depicted a Batboat, Bat-Sub, and Batcycle, among other bat-themed vehicles. The 1960s television series Batman has an arsenal that includes such "bat-" names as the Bat-computer, Bat-scanner, bat-radar, bat-cuffs, bat-pontoons, bat-drinking water dispenser, bat-camera with polarized bat-filter, bat-shark repellent bat-spray, and Bat-rope. The storyline "A Death in the Family" suggests that given Batman's grim nature, he is unlikely to have adopted the "bat" prefix on his own. In The Dark Knight Returns, Batman tells Carrie Kelley that the original Robin came up with the name "Batmobile" when he was young, since that is what a kid would call Batman's vehicle.

The Batmobile was redesigned in 2011 when DC Comics relaunched its entire line of comic books, with the Batmobile being given heavier armor and new aesthetics.

Utility belt

Batman keeps most of his field equipment in his utility belt. Over the years it has shown to contain an assortment of crime-fighting tools, weapons, and investigative and technological instruments. Different versions of the belt have these items stored in compartments, often as pouches or hard cylinders attached evenly around it.

Batman is often depicted as carrying a projectile which shoots a retractable grappling hook attached to a cable. This allows him to attach to distant objects, be propelled into the air, and thus swing from the rooftops of Gotham City.

An exception to the range of Batman's equipment are hand guns, which he refuses to use on principle, since a gun was used in his parents' murder. In modern stories in terms of his vehicles, Batman compromises on that principle to install weapon systems on them for the purpose of non-lethally disabling other vehicles, forcing entry into locations and attacking dangerous targets too large to defeat by other means.

Bat-Signal

When Batman is needed, the Gotham City police activate a searchlight with a bat-shaped insignia over the lens called the Bat-Signal, which shines into the night sky, creating a bat-symbol on a passing cloud which can be seen from any point in Gotham. The origin of the signal varies, depending on the continuity and medium.

In various incarnations, most notably the 1960s Batman TV series, Commissioner Gordon also has a dedicated phone line, dubbed the Bat-Phone, connected to a bright red telephone (in the TV series) which sits on a wooden base and has a transparent top. The line connects directly to Batman's residence, Wayne Manor, specifically both to a similar phone sitting on the desk in Bruce Wayne's study and the extension phone in the Batcave.

Batcave

The Batcave is Batman's secret headquarters, consisting of a series of caves beneath his mansion, Wayne Manor. As his command center, the Batcave serves multiple purposes; supercomputer, surveillance, redundant power-generators, forensics lab, medical infirmary, private study, training dojo, fabrication workshop, arsenal, hangar and garage. It houses the vehicles and equipment Batman uses in his campaign to fight crime. It is also a trophy room and storage facility for Batman's unique memorabilia collected over the years from various cases he has worked on.

In both the comic book Batman: Shadow of the Bat #45 and the 2005 film Batman Begins, the cave is said to have been part of the Underground Railroad.

Fictional character biography 
Batman's history has undergone many retroactive continuity revisions, both minor and major. Elements of the character's history have varied greatly. Scholars William Uricchio and Roberta E. Pearson noted in the early 1990s, "Unlike some fictional characters, the Batman has no primary urtext set in a specific period, but has rather existed in a plethora of equally valid texts constantly appearing over more than five decades."

20th century

Origin 

The central fixed event in the Batman stories is the character's origin story. As a young boy, Bruce Wayne was horrified and traumatized when he watched his parents, the physician Dr. Thomas Wayne and his wife Martha, murdered with a gun by a mugger named Joe Chill. Batman refuses to utilize any sort of gun on the principle that a gun was used to murder his parents. This event drove him to train his body to its peak condition and fight crime in Gotham City as Batman. Pearson and Uricchio also noted beyond the origin story and such events as the introduction of Robin, "Until recently, the fixed and accruing and hence, canonized, events have been few in number", a situation altered by an increased effort by later Batman editors such as Dennis O'Neil to ensure consistency and continuity between stories.

Golden Age 

In Batman's first appearance in Detective Comics #27, he is already operating as a crime-fighter. Batman's origin is first presented in Detective Comics #33 (November 1939) and is later expanded upon in Batman #47. As these comics state, Bruce Wayne is born to Dr. Thomas Wayne and his wife Martha, two very wealthy and charitable Gotham City socialites. Bruce is brought up in Wayne Manor, and leads a happy and privileged existence until the age of 8, when his parents are killed by a small-time criminal named Joe Chill while on their way home from a movie theater. That night, Bruce Wayne swears an oath to spend his life fighting crime. He engages in intense intellectual and physical training; however, he realizes that these skills alone would not be enough. "Criminals are a superstitious cowardly lot", Wayne remarks, "so my disguise must be able to strike terror into their hearts. I must be a creature of the night, black, terrible ..." As if responding to his desires, a bat suddenly flies through the window, inspiring Bruce to craft the Batman persona.

In early strips, Batman's career as a vigilante earns him the ire of the police. During this period, Bruce Wayne has a fiancé named Julie Madison. In Detective Comics #38, Wayne takes in an orphaned circus acrobat, Dick Grayson, who becomes his vigilante partner, Robin. Batman also becomes a founding member of the Justice Society of America, although he, like Superman, is an honorary member, and thus only participates occasionally. Batman's relationship with the law thaws quickly, and he is made an honorary member of Gotham City's police department. During this time, Alfred Pennyworth arrives at Wayne Manor, and after deducing the Dynamic Duo's secret identities, joins their service as their butler.

Silver Age 
The Silver Age of Comic Books in DC Comics is sometimes held to have begun in 1956 when the publisher introduced Barry Allen as a new, updated version of the Flash. Batman is not significantly changed by the late 1950s for the continuity which would be later referred to as Earth-One. The lighter tone Batman had taken in the period between the Golden and Silver Ages led to the stories of the late 1950s and early 1960s that often feature many science-fiction elements, and Batman is not significantly updated in the manner of other characters until Detective Comics #327 (May 1964), in which Batman reverts to his detective roots, with most science-fiction elements jettisoned from the series.

After the introduction of DC Comics' Multiverse in the 1960s, DC established that stories from the Golden Age star the Earth-Two Batman, a character from a parallel world. This version of Batman partners with and marries the reformed Earth-Two Catwoman (Selina Kyle). The two have a daughter, Helena Wayne, who becomes the Huntress. She assumes the position as Gotham's protector along with Dick Grayson, the Earth-Two Robin, once Bruce Wayne retires to become police commissioner. Wayne holds the position of police commissioner until he is killed during one final adventure as Batman. Batman titles, however, often ignored that a distinction had been made between the pre-revamp and post-revamp Batmen (since unlike the Flash or Green Lantern, Batman comics had been published without interruption through the 1950s) and would occasionally make reference to stories from the Golden Age. Nevertheless, details of Batman's history were altered or expanded upon through the decades. Additions include meetings with a future Superman during his youth, his upbringing by his uncle Philip Wayne (introduced in Batman #208 (February 1969)) after his parents' death, and appearances of his father and himself as prototypical versions of Batman and Robin, respectively. In 1980, then-editor Paul Levitz commissioned the Untold Legend of the Batman miniseries to thoroughly chronicle Batman's origin and history.

Batman meets and regularly works with other heroes during the Silver Age, most notably Superman, whom he began regularly working alongside in a series of team-ups in World's Finest Comics, starting in 1954 and continuing through the series' cancellation in 1986. Batman and Superman are usually depicted as close friends. As a founding member of the Justice League of America, Batman appears in its first story, in 1960's The Brave and the Bold #28. In the 1970s and 1980s, The Brave and the Bold became a Batman title, in which Batman teams up with a different DC Universe superhero each month.

Bronze Age 
In 1969, Dick Grayson attends college as part of DC Comics' effort to revise the Batman comics. Additionally, Batman also moves from his mansion, Wayne Manor into a penthouse apartment atop the Wayne Foundation building in downtown Gotham City, in order to be closer to Gotham City's crime. In 1974's "Night of the Stalker" storyline, a diploma on the wall reveals Bruce Wayne as a graduate of Yale Law School. Batman spends the 1970s and early 1980s mainly working solo, with occasional team-ups with Robin and/or Batgirl. Batman's adventures also become somewhat darker and more grim during this period, depicting increasingly violent crimes, including the first appearance (since the early Golden Age) of the Joker as a homicidal psychopath, and the arrival of Ra's al Ghul, a centuries-old terrorist who knows Batman's secret identity. In the 1980s, Dick Grayson becomes Nightwing.

In the final issue of The Brave and the Bold in 1983, Batman quits the Justice League and forms a new group called the Outsiders. He serves as the team's leader until Batman and the Outsiders #32 (1986) and the comic subsequently changed its title.

Modern Age 
After the 12-issue miniseries Crisis on Infinite Earths, DC Comics retconned the histories of some major characters in an attempt at updating them for contemporary audiences. Frank Miller retold Batman's origin in the storyline "Year One" from Batman #404–407, which emphasizes a grittier tone in the character. Though the Earth-Two Batman is erased from history, many stories of Batman's Silver Age/Earth-One career (along with an amount of Golden Age ones) remain canonical in the Post-Crisis universe, with his origins remaining the same in essence, despite alteration. For example, Gotham's police are mostly corrupt, setting up further need for Batman's existence. The guardian Phillip Wayne is removed, leaving young Bruce to be raised by Alfred Pennyworth. Additionally, Batman is no longer a founding member of the Justice League of America, although he becomes leader for a short time of a new incarnation of the team launched in 1987. To help fill in the revised backstory for Batman following Crisis, DC launched a new Batman title called Legends of the Dark Knight in 1989 and has published various miniseries and one-shot stories since then that largely take place during the "Year One" period.

Subsequently, Batman begins exhibiting an excessive, reckless approach to his crimefighting, a result of the pain of losing Jason Todd. Batman works solo until the decade's close, when Tim Drake becomes the new Robin.

Many of the major Batman storylines since the 1990s have been intertitle crossovers that run for a number of issues. In 1993, DC published "Knightfall". During the storyline's first phase, the new villain Bane paralyzes Batman, leading Wayne to ask Azrael to take on the role. After the end of "Knightfall", the storylines split in two directions, following both the Azrael-Batman's adventures, and Bruce Wayne's quest to become Batman once more. The story arcs realign in "KnightsEnd", as Azrael becomes increasingly violent and is defeated by a healed Bruce Wayne. Wayne hands the Batman mantle to Dick Grayson (then Nightwing) for an interim period, while Wayne trains for a return to the role.

The 1994 company-wide crossover storyline Zero Hour: Crisis in Time! changes aspects of DC continuity again, including those of Batman. Noteworthy among these changes is that the general populace and the criminal element now considers Batman an urban legend rather than a known force.

Batman once again becomes a member of the Justice League during Grant Morrison's 1996 relaunch of the series, titled JLA. During this time, Gotham City faces catastrophe in the decade's closing crossover arc. In 1998's "Cataclysm" storyline, Gotham City is devastated by an earthquake and ultimately cut off from the United States. Deprived of many of his technological resources, Batman fights to reclaim the city from legions of gangs during 1999's "No Man's Land".

Meanwhile, Batman's relationship with the Gotham City Police Department changed for the worse with the events of "Batman: Officer Down" and "Batman: War Games/War Crimes"; Batman's long-time law enforcement allies Commissioner Gordon and Harvey Bullock are forced out of the police department in "Officer Down", while "War Games" and "War Crimes" saw Batman become a wanted fugitive after a contingency plan of his to neutralize Gotham City's criminal underworld is accidentally triggered, resulting in a massive gang war that ends with the sadistic Black Mask the undisputed ruler of the city's criminal gangs. Lex Luthor arranges for the murder of Batman's on-again, off-again love interest Vesper Lynd (introduced in the mid-1990s) during the "Bruce Wayne: Murderer?" and "Bruce Wayne: Fugitive" story arcs. Though Batman is able to clear his name, he loses another ally in the form of his new bodyguard Sasha, who is recruited into the organization known as "Checkmate" while stuck in prison due to her refusal to turn state's evidence against her employer. While he was unable to prove that Luthor was behind the murder of Vesper, Batman does get his revenge with help from Talia al Ghul in Superman/Batman #1–6.

21st century

2000s 
DC Comics' 2005 miniseries Identity Crisis reveals that JLA member Zatanna had edited Batman's memories to prevent him from stopping the Justice League from lobotomizing Dr. Light after he raped Sue Dibny. Batman later creates the Brother I satellite surveillance system to watch over and, if necessary, kill the other heroes after he remembered. The revelation of Batman's creation and his tacit responsibility for the Blue Beetle's death becomes a driving force in the lead-up to the Infinite Crisis miniseries, which again restructures DC continuity. Batman and a team of superheroes destroy Brother EYE and the OMACs, though, at the very end, Batman reaches his apparent breaking point when Alexander Luthor Jr. seriously wounds Nightwing. Picking up a gun, Batman nearly shoots Luthor in order to avenge his former sidekick, until Wonder Woman convinces him to not pull the trigger.

Following Infinite Crisis, Bruce Wayne, Dick Grayson (having recovered from his wounds), and Tim Drake retrace the steps Bruce had taken when he originally left Gotham City, to "rebuild Batman". In the Face the Face storyline, Batman and Robin return to Gotham City after their year-long absence. Part of this absence is captured during Week 30 of the 52 series, which shows Batman fighting his inner demons. Later on in 52, Batman is shown undergoing an intense meditation ritual in Nanda Parbat. This becomes an important part of the regular Batman title, which reveals that Batman is reborn as a more effective crime fighter while undergoing this ritual, having "hunted down and ate" the last traces of fear in his mind. At the end of the "Face the Face" story arc, Bruce officially adopts Tim (who had lost both of his parents at various points in the character's history) as his son. The follow-up story arc in Batman, Batman and Son, introduces Damian Wayne, who is Batman's son with Talia al Ghul. Although originally, in Batman: Son of the Demon, Bruce's coupling with Talia was implied to be consensual, this arc retconned it into Talia forcing herself on Bruce.

Batman, along with Superman and Wonder Woman, reforms the Justice League in the new Justice League of America series, and is leading the newest incarnation of the Outsiders.

Grant Morrison's 2008 storyline, "Batman R.I.P." featured Batman being physically and mentally broken by the enigmatic villain Doctor Hurt and attracted news coverage in advance of its highly promoted conclusion, which would speculated to feature the death of Bruce Wayne. However, though Batman is shown to possibly perish at the end of the arc, the two-issue arc "Last Rites", which leads into the crossover storyline "Final Crisis", shows that Batman survives his helicopter crash into the Gotham City River and returns to the Batcave, only to be summoned to the Hall of Justice by the JLA to help investigate the New God Orion's death. The story ends with Batman retrieving the god-killing bullet used to kill Orion, setting up its use in "Final Crisis". In the pages of Final Crisis Batman is reduced to a charred skeleton. In Final Crisis #7, Wayne is shown witnessing the passing of the first man, Anthro. Wayne's "death" sets up the three-issue Battle for the Cowl miniseries in which Wayne's ex-proteges compete for the "right" to assume the role of Batman, which concludes with Grayson becoming Batman, while Tim Drake takes on the identity of the Red Robin. Dick and Damian continue as Batman and Robin, and in the crossover storyline "Blackest Night", what appears to be Bruce's corpse is reanimated as a Black Lantern zombie, but is later shown that Bruce's corpse is one of Darkseid's failed Batman clones. Dick and Batman's other friends conclude that Bruce is alive.

2010s 
Bruce subsequently returned in Morrison's miniseries Batman: The Return of Bruce Wayne, which depicted his travels through time from prehistory to present-day Gotham. Bruce's return set up Batman Incorporated, an ongoing series which focused on Wayne franchising the Batman identity across the globe, allowing Dick and Damian to continue as Gotham's Dynamic Duo. Bruce publicly announced that Wayne Enterprises will aid Batman on his mission, known as "Batman, Incorporated". However, due to rebooted continuity that occurred as part of DC Comics' 2011 relaunch of all of its comic books, The New 52, Dick Grayson was restored as Nightwing with Wayne serving as the sole Batman once again. The relaunch also interrupted the publication of Batman, Incorporated, which resumed its story in 2012–2013 with changes to suit the new status quo.

The New 52 
During The New 52, all of DC's continuity was reset and the timeline was changed, making Batman the first superhero to emerge. This emergence took place during Zero Year, where Bruce Wayne returns to Gotham and becomes Batman, fighting the original Red Hood and the Riddler. In the present day, Batman discovers the Court of Owls, a secret organization operating in Gotham for decades. Batman somewhat defeats the Court by defeating Owlman, although the Court continues to operate on a smaller scale. The Joker returns after losing the skin on his face (as shown in the opening issue of the second volume of Detective Comics) and attempts to kill the Batman's allies, though he is stopped by Batman. After some time, Joker returns again, and both he and Batman die while fighting each other. Jim Gordon temporarily becomes Batman, using a high-tech suit, while it is revealed that an amnesiac Bruce Wayne is still alive. Gordon attempts to fight a new villain called Mr. Bloom, while Wayne, regains his memories with the help of Alfred Pennyworth and Julie Madison. Once with his memories, Wayne becomes Batman again and defeats Mr. Bloom with the help of Gordon.

DC Rebirth 
The timeline was reset again during Rebirth, although no significant changes were made to the Batman mythos.  Batman meets two new superheroes operating in Gotham named Gotham and Gotham Girl. Psycho-Pirate gets into Gotham's head and turns against Batman, and is finally defeated when he is killed. This event is very traumatic for Gotham Girl and she begins to lose her sanity.

Batman forms his own Suicide Squad, including Catwoman, and attempts to take down Bane. The mission is successful, and Batman breaks Bane's back. Batman proposes to Catwoman.

After healing from his wounds, an angry Bane travels to Gotham, where he fights Batman and loses. Batman then tells Catwoman about the War of Jokes and Riddles, and she agrees to marry him. Bane takes control of Arkham Asylum and manipulates Catwoman into leaving Wayne before the wedding. This causes Wayne to become very angry, and, as Batman, lashes out against criminals, nearly killing Mr. Freeze.

Batman learns of Bane's control over Arkham and teams up with the Penguin to stop him. Bane captures Batman, and Scarecrow causes him to hallucinate, although he eventually breaks free. Batman escapes and reunites with Catwoman, while Bane captures and kills Alfred Pennyworth. Batman returns and defeats Bane, although too late to save Alfred. Gotham Girl prompts him to marry Catwoman.

It is revealed that the Joker who was working for Bane was really Clayface in disguise. The real Joker has been plotting a master plan to take over Gotham. This plan comes to fruition during The Joker War, in which Joker takes over the city. Batman defeats the Joker who vanishes after an explosion. Ghost-Maker, an enemy from Batman's past, appears in Gotham, and, after a battle, becomes a sort of ally to Batman. A new group called the Magistrate rises up in Gotham, led by Simon Saint, whose goal is to outlaw vigilantes such as Batman. At the same time, Scarecrow returns, fighting Batman. During Fear State, Batman battles and defeats both Scarecrow and the Magistrate's Peacekeepers.

Other versions

Smallville
Batman/Bruce Wayne is featured in the Smallville Season 11 digital comic based on the TV series. As a young boy, Bruce Wayne saw his parents gunned down by Joe Chill. This incident changed Bruce's life forever. In 2001, Bruce donned the persona of "Batman", to fight the criminals of Gotham City. Bruce fought criminals on his own for the better part of the next ten years. However, by 2011, Bruce had begun working with the young Barbara Gordon who became known as Nightwing. This same year, Bruce learned that Joe Chill was in Metropolis and went to confront him. His quest for Chill briefly led to Bruce getting into conflict with Superman. However, the two soon joined forces. When they found Chill, Bruce came close to killing him, but the Prankster and Mister Freeze beat him to it, on behalf of Intergang. The Prankster also gunned down Superman with Green Kryptonite bullets. Bruce managed to save his life, after which they apprehended the Prankster and Mister Freeze. 

Bruce was reluctant to join the Watchtower Network but kept finding himself working alongside its agents. Eventually, Bruce gave in and joined, to help them with the Crisis. After the battle against the Monitors, Bruce became a founding member of the Justice League. Furthermore, as Barbara was leaving Earth, Bruce got a new partner in Dick Grayson. 
 An villainous version of Bruce appears in the form of Earth-13 Batman resembling the Joker with a patchwork costume.

Citizen Wayne 
In Batman: Citizen Wayne, the role of Batman is taken on by Harvey Dent after his whole face has been destroyed by an enemy. Bruce Wayne is a newspaper publisher who is highly critical of Batman and his brutal methods and goes after him when he actually kills the enemy in question, both men dying in the final battle.

DC Bombshells 
In the opening of the DC Bombshells continuity set during World War II, Bruce's parents are saved from Joe Chill's attack thanks to the baseball superheroine known as Batwoman. While Batman does not exist in this continuity, Kate Kane does borrow a number of elements from the main version, such as inspiring younger heroines to follow in her steps as Batgirls and losing a child named Jason. In the book's conclusion that takes place 15 years into the future, a grown up Bruce Wayne becomes Batman (not out of tragedy but out of inspiration by the Bombshells) and is trained by the older Catwoman to herald in the new age of superheroes.

The Dark Knight Returns 

The Batman from Frank Miller's Batman: The Dark Knight Returns and its spin-offs, Batman: The Dark Knight Strikes Again and All Star Batman and Robin the Boy Wonder is a tired vigilante in a much darker, edgier setting home to Miller's own new interpretations of various DC characters.

The Dark Multiverse 
In the 2017 Dark Nights: Metal event, it is revealed that a Dark Multiverse exists alongside the main DC Multiverse. Each reality in the Dark Multiverse is negative and transient reflection of its existing counterpart, which were intended to be acquired by World Forger who would feed these timelines to his 'dragon', Barbatos. However, this balance came to an end when Barbatos escaped his bonds and allowed the rejected timelines to remain in some form of existence. Eventually, Barbatos is released onto the DC universe when Batman is treated with five unique metals, turning him into a portal to the Dark Multiverse, with this portal also allowing Barbatos to summon an army of evil alternate Batmen known as the Dark Knights, led by a God-like Batman, who describe themselves as having been created based on Batman's dark imaginations of what he could do if he possessed the powers of his colleagues.

During the Dark Nights: Death Metal storyline, more Dark Multiverse versions of Batman appear.<ref name="Dark Knights: Death Metal: Legends of the Dark Knights #1">Dark Nights: Death Metal Legends of the Dark Knights #1. DC Comics.</ref>

Barbatos
Barbatos is a hooded, God-like being in the Dark Multiverse. Barbatos had previously visited Prime-Earth in the DC Multiverse and founded the Tribe of Judas, which would later become the Court of Owls. Sometime before returning (either willingly or not) to the Dark Multiverse, Barbatos encountered Hawkman/Carter Hall, and was hit by his mace. Barbatos tried to return to the Multiverse but the events of Final Crisis prevented him from doing so. However, after witnessing Bruce Wayne/Batman being sent back in time by Darkseid's Omega Beams, Barbatos realised the similarities between his and Bruce's Bat emblems and believed he could use him as a doorway. Barbatos' followers manipulated events in order for Bruce to be injected with four out of the five metals needed to create the doorway, and after the fifth was injected in the present day, Barbatos was able to transport himself and the Dark Knights to Prime-Earth to conquer it.

The Batman Who Laughs
The Batman Who Laughs is a version of Batman from Earth -22, a dark reflection of the Earth-22. In that reality, the Earth -22 Joker learned of Batman's identity as Bruce Wayne and killed most of Batman's other rogues along with Commissioner Gordon. He then subjected a sizeable population of Gotham's populace to the chemicals that transformed him, subsequently killing several parents in front of their children with the goal of turning them into essentially a combination of himself and Batman. When Batman grappled with the Joker, it resulted in the latter's death as Batman is exposed to a purified form of the chemicals that gradually turned him into a new Joker, the process proving irreversible by the time Batman discovered what was happening to him. The Batman who Laughs proceeded to take over Earth-22, killing off most of his allies and turning Damian into a mini-Joker. The Batman Who Laughs seems to be the de facto leader or second-in-command of Barbatos' Dark Knights and recruited the other members. After arriving on Prime-Earth, the Batman Who Laughs takes control of Gotham and oversees events at the Challenger's mountain. He distributes joker cards to the Batman's Rogues, giving them the ability to alter reality and take over sections of the city. Accompanying him are Damian and three other youths whom he also calls his sons, all four being twisted versions of Robin, having intended to destroy all of reality by linking the Over-Monitor to Anti-Monitor's astral brain. But The Batman Who Laughs is defeated when the Prime Universe Batman is aided by the Joker, who notes the alternate Batman's failure to perceive this scenario due to still being a version of Batman. While assumed dead, the Batman who Laughs is revealed to be in the custody of Lex Luthor who offers him a place in the Legion of Doom.

Red Death
The Red Death is a version of Batman from Earth -52, originally an aged man who broke after the deaths of Dick, Jason, Tim, and Damian. Believing he has a chance to prevent the loss of more loved ones, Bruce decides he needs the Flash's Speed Force to achieve this and equips himself with the Rogues' equipment to capture the Flash. He knocks Barry out and ties him to the Batmobile, which has a machine created from reverse-engineering the Cosmic Treadmill attached to it. Using this machine against Barry's wishes, Bruce drove straight into the Speed Force while absorbing Barry in the process. Scarred by the ordeal, he developed a split personality created from residual traces of the Earth -52 Barry's mind. The newly-born Red Death tests his new powers but realizes he cannot stop his Earth from its destruction until he is recruited by The Batman Who Laughs, who promises him a new Earth to live upon. After entering Prime-Earth, the Red Death arrives in Central City and is confronted by Iris West and Wally West, during which he uses his powers to slow Wally and age them both. The Flash confronts the Red Death, and Doctor Fate saves Barry before the latter can attack. The Red Death proclaims that he will save Central City and make it his new home. After Barry is transported to a 'sand'-filled cave beneath Central City, the Red Death arrives and reveals several Flashmobiles and chases after Barry. During the events of the Wild Hunt, the Red Death ceased when exposed by an energy wave from the release of a newly born universe with the restored -52 Barry eventually destroyed from the energy consuming him.

 A different version of Red Death appears in the ninth and final season of The Flash set in the Arrowverse as an alternate version of Ryan Wilder (Javicia Leslie). This version comes from an alternate timeline where the Wayne family adopted her and Batman doesn't exist. Like the original timeline, the Waynes were shot and killed in Crime Alley, prompting Ryan to become the vigilante Batwoman to protect Gotham City from crime. She met other heroes such as Barry Allen / The Flash and befriended his wife Iris West-Allen. At some point in her career, Ryan noticed her way of putting criminals behind bars only allowed them to escape. She studied the Flash's abilities, built an artificial speed force using an armor she created, and began fighting crime as the Red Death. Eventually, she became reckless and killed Iris during one of her fights with the Flash. The Speed Force rejected Ryan as it wasn't organic, so they left her in a vibrational form leading her to the main timeline. Here, Ryan teams up with this timeline's rogues to help her build a time machine and help her get back to her original form using Wayne Enterprises technology. After doing so, this timeline's Flash intervenes and fights her with his team of reformed rogues. Ryan is defeated by Flash and this timeline's Batwoman and taken into A.R.G.U.S. custody.

Murder Machine
The Murder Machine is a version of Batman from Earth -44, a dark reflection of the Earth-44. Distraught from having lost Alfred, Batman requested Cyborg to help him finish the Alfred Protocol, an A.I. version of Alfred. But the Alfred Protocol malfunctioned upon activation and began to multiply and kill all of Batman's Rogues Gallery. Bruce pleaded with Cyborg to help find a way to fix it but the latter refused. The Alfred Protocol began to merge with Bruce and the two became the Murder Machine, and his first act as this new entity was to kill Cyborg. After being recruited by the Batman Who Laughs, the Murder Machine arrives on Prime-Earth with the other Dark Knights. He proceeds to the Justice League's Watchtower and confronts Cyborg. After Cyborg is incapacitated by the other Dark Knights, the Murder Machine infects and converts the Watchtower as the Dark Knights' new base of operations.

Dawnbreaker
The Dawnbreaker is a version of Batman from Earth -32, a dark reflection of the Earth-32 where Batman became a Green Lantern. When Earth -32 Bruce lost his parents to Joe Chill, he is chosen by a Green Power Ring to become a Green Lantern. But Bruce's will overrides the ring's ban on lethal force and corrupts it, enabling him to use it to kill Chill and various criminals. After Bruce killed Gordon when eventually confronted, he wipes out the Green Lantern Corp and the Guardians of the Universe when they confront him. Bruce then entered his giant Green Lantern Power Battery and exits with a new outfit and moniker, the Dawnbreaker. However, he finds that his Earth has begun to collapse and he is met by the Batman Who Laughs who, after recruiting the Red Death and the Murder Machine, recruits the Dawnbreaker, promising him a new world to shroud in darkness. After arriving on Earth-0, Dawnbreaker heads to Coast City where he is confronted by Hal Jordan. Dawnbreaker tries to consume Hal Jordan in a 'blackout' but the latter is rescued by Doctor Fate. With Green Lantern gone, Dawnbreaker takes control of Coast City. The Dawnbreaker confronts Hal Jordan in a blacked out cave underneath Coast City, claiming that the Green Lantern oath is worthless in his cave.

Drowned
The Drowned is a version of Batman from Earth -11, a dark reflection of the reversed-gender Earth-11. Originally known as Batwoman, Bryce Wayne was in a relationship with Sylvester Kyle (Earth-11's male version of Selina Kyle) until he was killed by a metahuman. A revenge-driven Bryce spent 18 months hunting down every rogue metahuman before Aquawoman and the Atlanteans emerged from their self-imposed exile. While Aquawoman claimed her people came in peace, a skeptical Bryce declared war on Atlantis with the Atlanteans flooding Gotham in retaliation when their queen was killed. Bryce survived the disaster by performing auto-surgery on herself by introducing mutated hybrid DNA into her body, giving Bryce the ability to breath underwater, accelerated healing, and water manipulation. She also created an army of Dead Waters to fight for her. Donning a new attire, Bryce called herself The Drowned and successfully conquered Atlantis at the cost of flooding every city. After seeing her signal being lit, the Drowned met the Batman Who Laughs, who recruits her as a Dark Knight. After arriving on Earth-0, the Drowned headed to Amnesty Bay, where she was confronted by Aquaman and Mera. The two were unable to combat the Drowned and her army of Dead Waters, with Mera becoming infected and controlled by the Drowned while Aquaman was saved by Doctor Fate. The Drowned proceeded to take control of Amnesty Bay. When Aquaman is transported fathoms below Amnesty Bay, the Drowned attacks him, revealing that the infected Mera has mutated into a gargantuan shark/crab/octopus creature.

Merciless
The Merciless is a version of Batman from Earth -12. Here Batman is in a relationship with Wonder Woman. Having killed Ares in a fit of rage when Ares presumably kills Wonder woman , the Earth -12 Batman acquired Ares's helmet and assumed that he can channel its power to war with justice and mercy rather than ruthless brutality. But it corrupted him and the 'Merciless' Batman ended up killing Wonder Woman (who had actually just been knocked out) while eliminating all his enemies. The Merciless is later depicted as destroying the Valhalla Mountain when Sam Lane, Amanda Waller, Steve Trevor and Mister Bones attempt a counter-attack against the Dark Batmen after the regular heroes have apparently failed. The Merciless confronts Wonder Woman after she is transported under the foundation of A.R.G.U.S Headquarters in Washington D.C., revealing his armory filled with the divine arsenal of the Gods he killed on his Earth. He reveals to her that his Diana taught him to fight and after he destroyed the Gods, the Merciless found Themyscria and fought them for three days. The Merciless also reveals that he ordered the Ferryman at the River Styx to gather every coin from every dead Amazon seeking passage into the afterlife which he melted into a giant golden drachma, which he strikes with a hammer, summoning the undead Amazons.

Devastator
The Devastator is a version of Batman from Earth -1, a dark reflection of Earth-1. When Superman turned evil and kills friend and foe alike along with Lois, the Earth-1 Batman injected himself with an engineered version of the Doomsday virus to stop the Kryptonian at the cost of his humanity as he transformed into a Doomsday-like monster. Despite his victory, the Devastator still feels remorse for not being able to protect Metropolis from Superman's wrath. The Batman Who Laughs offers The Devastator a second chance at saving those whom he feels are blindly inspired by Superman. Bruce infects the Earth-0 Lois Lane, Supergirl, and all of Metropolis with the Doomsday virus as he views it as the only way to protect them from Superman's strength and false prophecies. Along with the Murder Machine, the Devastator was sent to retrieve the Cosmic Tuning Tower, ripping it out of its foundation and throwing it outside the Fortress of Solitude. He is then confronted by the two Green Lanterns of Earth (Simon Baz and Jessica Cruz), The Flash/Wally West, Firestorm, and Lobo and he proceeds to incapacitate all except Lobo who he throws into the Sun. Grabbing the Cosmic Tuning Tower, the Devastator leaps into space and lands on the Challenger's Mountain, planting the tower on top of it.

Bathomet
Bathomet is a Cthulhu-like Batman from an unknown part of the Dark Multiverse.

Batmage
Batmage is an evil sorcerer version of Batman from an unknown part of the Dark Multiverse.

Batmanosaurus Rex
Batmanosaurus Rex (also called B-Rex) is a version of Batman from an unknown part of the Dark Multiverse. It is the result of Batman uploading his mind into the robotic Tyrannosaurus that he has in the Batcave when the Batcave collapsed for an unknown reason.

Castle Bat
Castle Bat is a version of Batman from an unknown part of the Dark Multiverse who sacrificed Damian Wayne as part of a ritual that would merge his soul with Gotham City enabling him to easily hunt down every villain. The Batman Who Laughs uses him as a headquarters for the Dark Knights.

Darkfather
Darkfather is a Batman from an unknown part of the Dark Multiverse who defeated Darkseid and acquired his powers. After mastering the Anti-Life Equation, Darkfather turned the Parademons of Apokolips into his Pararobins.

Dr. Arkham
Dr. Arkham is a Batman from an unknown part of the Dark Multiverse who left the vigilante business and took part in performing experiments on humans.

Batmanhattan
Batmanhattan is a Batman from an unknown part of the Dark Multiverse who harnessed the powers of Doctor Manhattan. The Batman Who Laughs would later lobotomize Batmanhattan and then transplant his brain into Batmanhattan in order to become Darkest Knight.

Batom
Batom is a Batman from an unknown part of the Dark Multiverse who sports the same Bio-Belt as Atom.

Batmobeast
Batmobeast is a version of Batman from an unknown part of the Dark Multiverse whose consciousness was uploaded into a monster truck after every digital system was destroyed by the people of his Earth.

Robin King
Robin King is a child version of Bruce Wayne from an unknown part of the Dark Multiverse who developed mass-murdering tendencies.

Baby Batman
Baby Batman is a baby version of Batman from an unknown part of the Dark Multiverse who downloaded his mind into an infant-resembling artificial body.

Grim Knight
 Grim Knight is a Batman from an unknown part of the Dark Multiverse who wields firearms ever since the day his parents were killed by Joe Chill.

 Injustice: Gods Among Us 
In Injustice: Gods Among Us, Batman was originally close friends with Superman (with Superman even asking him to be godfather to his child with Lois Lane) but when Superman was tricked by the Joker into killing Lois and destroying Metropolis, their relationship slowly went from estranged to antagonistic to enemies. Superman begins a new world order where he and the Justice League use brute force and fear to coerce people into following the law, but Batman sees the tyranny in this and opposes Superman's Regime with his Insurgency. He suffers a few losses, notably of Dick Grayson by the hands of his biological son Damian (albeit by accident), who sided with Superman. By the end of Year One Superman breaks Batman's back in an attempt to delay any future defiance. During most of Year Two Batman is out of commission, relying on his allies to stop the Regime when the Green Lantern Corps gets involved. In Year Three Batman allies himself with magic-users, notably John Constantine, though this ends with Constantine revealed to have been using Batman to further his own goals. Year Four has Batman look to the Greek gods to stop Superman. However, he comes to regret this when the gods decide to overpower humanity themselves, leading him to enlist the New God Highfather to stop them. He evades a trap set up by Superman when the fallen hero tries to make a meeting to discuss their problems. By the game's events, Batman has suffered many losses by the hands of the Regime and in a last-ditch effort summons the counterparts of Wonder Woman, Green Lantern, Green Arrow, and Aquaman from the mainstream universe, needing them to help him retrieve a shard of kryptonite from his now-abandoned Batcave; the kryptonite was meant to be a last resort for if Superman went rogue, but Batman made it he could only access it if key members of the League agreed. Since most of them allied with Superman who are dead (Green Arrow) he needed duplicates. When this plan fails, he is reluctant to bring over the mainstream Superman, convinced that any version of Superman is corruptible. However, his prime counterpart convinces him to have faith and he does so, with the mainstream Superman defeating his counterpart and ending the Regime's influence.

 JLA/Avengers 
In JLA/Avengers, Batman appears along with his teammates in the Justice League, when they are made to fight the Avengers in the Grandmaster's cosmic game. While touring the Marvel Universe for the first time, Batman witnesses the Punisher killing a gang of drug dealers, and attacks him (the fight takes place off-panel). He later forms an alliance with Captain America after engaging in a brief fistfight to test his opponent's skills. Due to this alliance, he realizes the stakes of the game and loses it for the JLA. When the two universes are merged by Krona, the heroes are left confused as to what actually occurred in their reality; the Grandmaster clarifies by showing them the various tragedies that befell the heroes in their lifetimes. Batman, for his part, witnesses Jason Todd's death and his injury at the hands of Bane. In the final battle, Krona defeats the JLA with minor difficulty, but is defeated when the Flash and Hawkeye disrupt his control of his power source.

 Just Imagine Just Imagine... is a series of comics created by Stan Lee (the co-creator of several Marvel Comics characters), with reimaginings of various DC characters.
In this continuity, Wayne Williams is framed for a crime he did not commit, works his way into getting out of prison, and becomes a mysterious wrestler known as Batman to fund a career as a vigilante using complex equipment to avenge himself against the criminals who originally framed him.

 Kingdom Come 
The Kingdom Come limited series depicts a Batman who, ravaged by years of fighting crime, uses an exoskeleton to keep himself together and keeps the peace on the streets of Gotham using remote-controlled robots. He is late middle-aged and wears an eerie grin. It is no longer a secret that he is Bruce Wayne and is referred to as the "Batman" even when he appears in civilian guise.

 Superman: American Alien 
In Superman: American Alien, a 2016 comic that shows an alternate retelling of Superman's origin, Bruce Wayne is training under Ra's al Ghul when he is told about someone posing as him at a birthday party thrown for him, causing Bruce to become interested in this person. Years later, having been Batman for a while, he finds out that the same person, revealed to be Clark Kent, is a reporter who spoke to Bruce's new ward Dick Grayson. Donning his costume, Bruce confronts Clark but is quickly overpowered, and is shocked when none of his equipment harms Clark. Clark finds out Bruce's identity by taking his mask and cape, and Bruce escapes. He seemingly leaves behind Clark's recording of his conversation with Dick, and Clark does not reveal Bruce's double life to the public. Bruce's cape later becomes part of Clark's prototype costume as he first begins his crime fighting career.

Batman:  White Knight
In the reality of Batman: White Knight, Bruce has grown up believing he is a descendant of Malcolm Wayne, the founder of Gotham City. In reality, though, he is actually a descendant of Bakkar, a man who'd murdered Malcolm Wayne and assumed his identity.  Jean-Paul Valley, aka Azrael, is actually the real Wayne descendant, which Bruce only learns from Jack Napier right before Jack forces Harley Quinn to kill him as the Joker will not let him kill himself. 

 Cultural impact and legacy 
Batman has become a pop culture icon, recognized around the world. The character's presence has extended beyond his comic book origins; events such as the release of the 1989 Batman film and its accompanying merchandising "brought the Batman to the forefront of public consciousness". In an article commemorating the sixtieth anniversary of the character, The Guardian wrote, "Batman is a figure blurred by the endless reinvention that is modern mass culture. He is at once an icon and a commodity: the perfect cultural artefact for the 21st century."

 In other media 

The character of Batman has appeared in various media aside from comic books, such as newspaper syndicated comic strips, books, radio dramas, television, a stage show, and several theatrical feature films. The first adaptation of Batman was as a daily newspaper comic strip which premiered on October 25, 1943. That same year the character was adapted in the 15-part serial Batman, with Lewis Wilson becoming the first actor to portray Batman on screen. While Batman never had a radio series of his own, the character made occasional guest appearances in The Adventures of Superman, starting in 1945 on occasions when Superman voice actor Bud Collyer needed time off. A second movie serial, Batman and Robin, followed in 1949, with Robert Lowery taking over the role of Batman. The exposure provided by these adaptations during the 1940s "helped make [Batman] a household name for millions who never bought a comic book".

In the 1964 publication of Donald Barthelme's collection of short stories Come Back, Dr. Caligari, Barthelme wrote "The Joker's Greatest Triumph". Batman is portrayed for purposes of spoof as a pretentious French-speaking rich man.

Television
The Batman television series, starring Adam West, premiered in January 1966 on the ABC television network. Inflected with a camp sense of humor, the show became a pop culture phenomenon. In his memoir, Back to the Batcave, West notes his dislike for the term 'camp' as it was applied to the 1960s series, opining that the show was instead a farce or lampoon, and a deliberate one, at that. The series ran for 120 episodes, ending in 1968. In between the first and second season of the Batman television series, the cast and crew made the theatrical film Batman (1966). The Who recorded the theme song from the Batman show for their 1966 EP Ready Steady Who, and The Kinks performed the theme song on their 1967 album Live at Kelvin Hall. Adam West also appeared in character as Batman in several commercials and a 1966 US Government PSA for Savings Bonds. Despite not having an immediate continuation, the series spawned a (failed) pilot episode for a spin-off Batgirl television series and, decades later, the Batman '66 (2013-2016) comic book series, the animated films Batman: Return of the Caped Crusaders (2016) and Batman vs. Two-Face (2017), and even the mockumentary Return to the Batcave: The Misadventures of Adam and Burt (2003).

In the 1996 episode Heroes and Villains of Only Fools and Horses, David Jason spoofed the role of Batman.

The popularity of the Batman TV series also resulted in the first animated adaptation of Batman in The Batman/Superman Hour; the Batman segments of the series were repackaged as The Adventures of Batman and Batman with Robin the Boy Wonder which produced thirty-three episodes between 1968 and 1977. From 1973 until 1986, Batman had a starring role in ABC's Super Friends series, which was animated by Hanna-Barbera. Olan Soule was the voice of Batman in all these shows, but was eventually replaced during Super Friends by Adam West, who also voiced the character in Filmation's 1977 series The New Adventures of Batman.

In 1992, Batman: The Animated Series premiered on the Fox television network, produced by Warner Bros. Animation and featuring Kevin Conroy as the voice of Batman. The series received considerable acclaim for its darker tone, mature writing, stylistic design, and thematic complexity compared to previous superhero cartoons, in addition to multiple Emmy Awards. The series' success led to the theatrical film Batman: Mask of the Phantasm (1993), as well as various spin-off TV series that included Superman: The Animated Series, The New Batman Adventures, Justice League and Justice League Unlimited (each of which also featured Conroy as Batman's voice). The futuristic series Batman Beyond also took place in this same animated continuity and featured a newer, younger Batman voiced by Will Friedle, with the elderly Bruce Wayne (again voiced by Conroy) as a mentor.

In 2004, an unrelated animated series titled The Batman made its debut with Rino Romano voicing Batman. In 2008, this show was replaced by another animated series, Batman: The Brave and the Bold, featuring Diedrich Bader's voice as Batman. In 2013, a new CGI-animated series titled Beware the Batman made its debut, with Anthony Ruivivar voicing Batman.

In 2014, the live-action TV series Gotham premiered on the Fox network, featuring David Mazouz as a 12-year-old Bruce Wayne. In 2018, when the series was renewed for its fifth and final season it was announced that Batman would make an appearance in the series finale's flash-forward.

Iain Glen portrays Bruce Wayne in the live-action series Titans, appearing in the show's second season in 2019. Prior to Glen, Batman was played by stunt doubles Alain Moussi and Maxim Savarias in the first season.

To commemorate the 75th anniversary of the character, Warner Bros aired the television short film, Batman: Strange Days, that was also posted on DC's YouTube channel.

In August 2019, it was announced that Kevin Conroy would make his live-action television debut as an older Bruce Wayne in the upcoming Arrowverse crossover, Crisis on Infinite Earths. In the crossover, he portrayed a parallel universe iteration of Batman from Earth-99. In Batwoman, the Earth-Prime version of Bruce Wayne / Batman is portrayed by Warren Christie.

In May 2021, it was announced that a new animated series titled Batman: Caped Crusader was in development by Bruce Timm (co-creator of Batman: The Animated Series), JJ Abrams, and Matt Reeves. The series is said to be a reimagining of the Caped Crusader that returns to the character's noir roots.

 Film 

As previously stated, Batman's first cinematic appearances consisted of the 1943 serial film Batman and its 1949 sequel Batman and Robin, which were both released by Columbia Pictures and depicted a government-backed version of Batman and Robin (censorship at the time would not have allowed for vigilantes to be depicted as unauthorized crimefighters). The serials (especially the first one) are, though, notorious for their accentuation on anti-Japanese sentiments due to their World War II-period setting. In 1966, 20th Century Fox released Batman's first feature-length film, titled Batman (also advertised as Batman: The Movie), based on and featuring most of the cast from the 1960s TV series.

Burton/Schumacher series
In 1989, Warner Bros. released the feature film Batman, directed by Tim Burton and starring Michael Keaton as the title character. The film was a huge success; not only was it the top-grossing film of the year, but at the time was the fifth highest-grossing film in history. The film also won the Academy Award for Best Art Direction. The film's success spawned three sequels: Batman Returns (1992), Batman Forever (1995) and Batman & Robin (1997), the latter two of which were directed by Joel Schumacher instead of Burton, and replaced Keaton as Batman with Val Kilmer and George Clooney, respectively. The second Schumacher film failed to outgross any of its predecessors and was critically panned, causing Warner Bros. to cancel the planned fourth sequel, Batman Unchained, and end the initial film series. The first two films later became the basis for the Burton-inspired comic book series Batman '89 (2021). In April 2021, it was announced that Keaton would reprise his role as Bruce Wayne / Batman for the 2023 film, The Flash.

The Dark Knight Trilogy
In 2005, Batman Begins was released by Warner Bros. as a reboot of the film series, directed by Christopher Nolan and starring Christian Bale as Batman. Its sequel, The Dark Knight (2008), set the record for the highest grossing opening weekend of all time in the U.S., earning approximately $158 million, and became the fastest film to reach the $400 million mark in the history of American cinema (eighteenth day of release). These record-breaking attendances saw The Dark Knight end its run as the second-highest domestic grossing film (at the time) with $533 million, bested then only by Titanic. The film also won two Academy Awards, including Best Supporting Actor for the late Heath Ledger. It was eventually followed by The Dark Knight Rises (2012), which served as a conclusion to Nolan's film series that has since been known as The Dark Knight Trilogy.

Animated films
Since 2008, Batman has also starred in various direct-to-video films under the DC Universe Animated Original Movies label. Kevin Conroy reprised his voice role of Batman for several of these films while others have featured celebrity voice actors in the role, including Jeremy Sisto, William Baldwin, Bruce Greenwood, Ben McKenzie, Peter Weller, and Jensen Ackles. In the direct-to-video films of the DC Animated Movie Universe, Batman was voiced by Kevin Conroy again in Justice League: The Flashpoint Paradox (2013) and by Jason O'Mara in all subsequent films, such as The Death of Superman (2018) and Batman: Hush (2019). A Lego-themed version of Batman was also featured as one of the protagonists in the theatrically-released animated film The Lego Movie (2014), with Will Arnett providing the voice. Arnett reprised the voice role for the spin-off film The Lego Batman Movie (2017), as well as for the sequel The Lego Movie 2: The Second Part (2019). Keanu Reeves voiced Batman in the animated film DC League of Super-Pets (2022).
DC Extended Universe

In 2016, Ben Affleck began portraying Batman in the DC Extended Universe with the release of the film Batman v Superman: Dawn of Justice, directed by Zack Snyder, a younger child version of the character was played by Brandon Spink in the same film. Affleck also made a cameo appearance as Batman in David Ayer's film Suicide Squad (2016). Affleck reprised the role in the 2017 film Justice League, also set in the DC Extended Universe, as well as the director's cut, Zack Snyder's Justice League. Affleck will reprise his role in the 2023 film, The Flash, also set in the DC Extended Universe. This and a cameo appearance in Aquaman and the Lost Kingdom are expected to be Affleck's last appearance in the role.

DC Elseworlds films
Dante Pereira-Olson portrays a young Bruce Wayne in the 2019 film Joker.

Robert Pattinson portrays Bruce Wayne / Batman in the 2022 film, The Batman, directed by Matt Reeves.

DC Universe
A new iteration of Batman is set to appear in the DC Universe (DCU) franchise, beginning with the film The Brave and the Bold, produced by DC Studios. The film will focus on Batman and Damian Wayne.

 Fine art 
Starting with the Pop Art period, and on a continuing basis, since the 1960s, the character of Batman has been "appropriated" by multiple visual artists and incorporated into contemporary artwork, most notably by Andy Warhol, Roy Lichtenstein, Mel Ramos, Dulce Pinzon, Mr. Brainwash, Raymond Pettibon, Peter Saul, and others.

 Video games 

Since 1986, Batman has starred in multiple video games, most of which were adaptations of the various cinematic or animated incarnations of the character. Among the most successful of these games is the Batman: Arkham series. The first installment, Batman: Arkham Asylum (2009), was released by Rocksteady Studios to critical acclaim; review aggregator Metacritic reports it as having received 92% positive reviews. It was followed by the sequel Batman: Arkham City (2011), which also received widespread acclaim and holds a Metacritic ranking of 94%. A prequel game titled Batman: Arkham Origins (2013) was later released by WB Games Montréal. A fourth game titled Batman: Arkham Knight (2015) has also been released by Rocksteady. As with most animated Batman media, Kevin Conroy provided the voice of the character for these games, with the exception of Arkham Origins in which the younger Batman is voiced by Roger Craig Smith. In 2016, Telltale Games released Batman: The Telltale Series adventure game, which changed the Wayne family's history as it is depicted in the Batman mythos. A sequel, titled Batman: The Enemy Within, was released in 2017.

 Role-playing games 
Mayfair Games published the DC Heroes role-playing game in 1985, then published the 80-page supplement Batman the following year, written by Mike Stackpole, with cover art by Ed Hannigan. In 1989, Mayfair Games published an updated 96-page softcover Batman Sourcebook, again written by Mike Stackpole, with additional material by J. Santana, Louis Prosperi, Jack Barker and Ray Winninger, with graphic design by Gregory Scott, and cover and interior art by DC Comics staff.

Mayfair released a simplified version of DC Heroes called The Batman Role-Playing Game in 1989 to coincide with the Batman film.

Interpretations
Gay interpretations

Gay interpretations of the character have been part of the academic study of Batman since psychologist Fredric Wertham asserted in Seduction of the Innocent in 1954 that "Batman stories are psychologically homosexual ...The Batman type of story may stimulate children to homosexual fantasies, of the nature of which they may be unconscious." Andy Medhurst wrote in his 1991 essay "Batman, Deviance, and Camp" that Batman is interesting to gay audiences because "he was one of the first fictional characters to be attacked on the grounds of his presumed homosexuality". Professor of film and cultural studies Will Brooker argues the validity of a queer reading of Batman, and that gay readers would naturally find themselves drawn to the lifestyle depicted within, whether the character of Bruce Wayne himself were explicitly gay or not. He also identifies a homophobic element to the vigor with which mainstream fandom rejects the possibility of a gay reading of the character. In 2005, painter Mark Chamberlain displayed a number of watercolors depicting both Batman and Robin in suggestive and sexually explicit poses, prompting DC to threaten legal action.

Creators associated with the character have expressed their own opinions. Writer Alan Grant has stated, "The Batman I wrote for 13 years isn't gay ...everybody's Batman all the way back to Bob Kane ...none of them wrote him as a gay character. Only Joel Schumacher might have had an opposing view." Frank Miller views the character as sublimating his sexual urges into crimefighting so much so that he is "borderline pathological", concluding "He'd be much healthier if he were gay." Grant Morrison said that "Gayness is built into Batman ...Obviously as a fictional character he's intended to be heterosexual, but the basis of the whole concept is utterly gay."

Psychological interpretations

Batman has been the subject of psychological study for some time, and there have been a number of interpretations into the character's psyche.

In Batman and Psychology: A Dark and Stormy Knight'', Dr. Travis Langley argues that the concept of archetypes as described by psychologists Carl Jung and Joseph Campbell is present in the Batman mythos, such that the character represents the "shadow archetype". This archetype, according to Langley, represents a person's own dark side; it is not necessarily an evil one, but rather one that is hidden from the outside and concealed from both the world and oneself. Langley argues that Bruce Wayne confronts his own darkness early in life; he chooses to use it to instill fear in wrongdoers, with his bright and dark sides working together to fight evil. Langley uses the Jungian perspective to assert that Batman appeals to our own need to face our "shadow selves". Langley also taught a class called Batman, a title he was adamant about. "I could have called it something like the Psychology of Nocturnal Vigilantism, but no. I called it Batman," Langley says.

Several psychologists have explored Bruce Wayne/Batman's mental health. Robin. S. Rosenberg evaluated his actions and problems to determine if they reach the level of mental disorders. She examined the possibility of several mental health issues, including dissociative identity disorder, obsessive–compulsive disorder, and several others. She concluded that Bruce Wayne/Batman may have a disorder or a combination of disorders but due to his fictional nature, a definitive diagnosis will remain unknown. However, Langley himself states in his book that Batman is far too functional and well-adjusted, due to his training, confrontation of his fear early on and other factors, to be mentally ill. More likely, he asserts Batman's mental attitude is far more in line with a dedicated Olympic athlete.

Notes

References

Sources

Further reading

External links 
 
 Batman Bio at the Unofficial Guide to the DC Universe
 
 Batman (1940–present) Comics Inventory
 

 
1939 comics debuts
1939 establishments in the United States
American culture
American male characters in television
Characters created by Bill Finger
Characters created by Bob Kane
Comics adapted into animated series
Comics adapted into plays
Comics adapted into radio series
Comics adapted into television series
Comics characters introduced in 1939
DC Animated Universe characters
DC Comics adapted into films
DC Comics adapted into video games
DC Comics American superheroes
DC Comics male superheroes
DC Comics martial artists
DC Comics orphans
DC Comics scientists
DC Comics television characters
Fictional aviators
Fictional blade and dart throwers
Fictional business executives
Fictional characters with eidetic memory
Fictional characters with post-traumatic stress disorder
Fictional criminologists
Fictional engineers
Fictional escapologists
Fictional foster carers
Fictional gentleman detectives
Fictional hackers
Fictional hybrid martial artists
Fictional inventors
Fictional male martial artists
Fictional martial arts trainers
Fictional philanthropists
Fictional socialites
Fictional torturers and interrogators
Fictional victims of sexual assault
Fictional Yale University people
Fictional Irish American people
Fighting game characters
Film serial characters
Male characters in film
Male characters in television
Superhero film characters
Superheroes with alter egos
Vigilante characters in comics